The white-breasted cormorant (Phalacrocorax lucidus) is much like the widespread great cormorant and if not a regional variant of the same species, is at least very closely related. It is distinguished from other forms of the great cormorant by its white breast and by the fact that subpopulations are freshwater birds. Phalacrocorax lucidus is not to be confused with the smaller and very different endemic South Australian black-faced cormorant, which also is sometimes called the white-breasted cormorant.

Taxonomy and description

The white-breasted cormorant (Phalacrocorax lucidus) is a member of the cormorant family Phalacrocoracidae.  Its taxonomic status has been under discussion for some decades and several questions still have not been definitively settled. Phalacrocorax lucidus sometimes is treated as a subspecies of the great cormorant, Phalacrocorax carbo lucidus, but some authorities (e.g. Sibley & Monroe, 1990, Sinclair, Hockey and Tarboton, 2002) retain its original treatment as an allospecies in the P. carbo superspecific group, in which case it is referred to as Phalacrocorax lucidus.  A black-necked form originally classified as Phalacrocorax patricki or Phalacrocorax carbo patricki is now regarded as synonymous with Phalacrocorax lucidus.

In other respects it is a large cormorant generally resembling the great cormorant.

The smaller and very different southern Australian black-faced cormorant, Phalacrocorax fuscescens, is also sometimes known as the white-breasted cormorant.

Distribution

The white-breasted cormorant is the only form of great cormorant found in Sub-Saharan Africa, the only form that has strictly freshwater populations and the only form with a white breast and throat; it does however interbreed freely with dark-breasted forms in central Africa.  It has a wide distribution; on the west coast from the Cape Verde Islands to Guinea-Bissau and from Angola to the Cape of Good Hope and northwards on the east coast to Mozambique. It occurs around the entire Southern African coastline, but it is not clear whether the coastal populations are separate from the inland populations. On the African mainland it occurs more frequently in eastern and southern parts, rather than in the drier western regions, where it usually is found only on perennial rivers and dams. On inland waters it commonly occurs together with the reed cormorant and the African darter, but it is ecologically separated from these species by its fishing habits and the size and nature of its prey.  There are also inland populations in Nigeria and around Lake Chad, and in eastern and southern Africa from Sudan southwards.  It can be found around the Red Sea, where it is sometimes referred to as the Red Sea white-breasted cormorant.

Gallery

References

Authors unknown (1974) The status of the cormorants, Phalacrocorax carbo lucidus and Phalacrocorax carbo patricki. Bulletin of the British Ornithologists' Club, 94, 104–107.
Johnsgaard, P. A. (1993).  Cormorants, darters and pelicans of the world.  Washington DC: Smithsonian Institution Press.
Sibley, C. G., & Monroe, B. L. (1990).  Distribution and taxonomy of birds of the world.  New Haven CT: Yale University Press.
Ian Sinclair, Phil Hockey and Warwick Tarboton, SASOL Birds of Southern Africa (Struik 2002)

External links
White-breasted cormorant - The Atlas of Southern African Birds
White-breasted cormorant sleeping on transmission lines -- paper in Biodiversity Observations

white-breasted cormorant
Birds of Sub-Saharan Africa
Birds of Southern Africa
white-breasted cormorant
Birds of East Africa